Kinguélé Aval Hydroelectric Power Station is a planned  hydroelectric power station, across the Mbei River, a tributary of the Komo River, in Gabon. The power station is the first grid-ready, privately owned hydroelectric power station in the country.

Location
Kinguélé Aval Hydroelectric Power Station will be downstream of the 69 megawatts Tchimbélé Hydroelectric Power Station and downstream of the 58 megawatts Kinguélé Hydroelectric Power Station.

Overview
The power station is under development by a consortium comprising
Meridiam, an international firm based in Paris, France, that focuses on "developing, financing and managing long-term public infrastructure projects", and the Gabonese Strategic Investment Fund (FGIS).

The owners have established a special-purpose vehicle company called Asonha Energie SA, to develop, manage and maintain the proposed power station and associated infrastructure developments. The energy generated at this power station will be sold to Société d’énergie et d’eau du Gabon (SEEG), the national electricity utility company, under a 30-year power purchase agreement (PPA).

Ownership
The table blow illustrates the shareholding in Asonha Energie, the special vehicle company, established to own, develop and manage the Kinguélé Aval Hydroelectric Power Station.

Construction costs and funding
The engineering, procurement and construction (EPC) contract for this project was awarded to Sinohydro, the Chinese, state-owned hydropower engineering and construction company. The construction budget has been reported as €176 million (approx. US$209 million).

The long list of funders for this power station include the entities listed in the table below:

See also

List of power stations in Gabon
FE2 Hydroelectric Power Station

References

External links
 New hydropower project for Gabon backed by AfDB As of 12 July 2021.

Hydroelectric power stations in Gabon
Proposed energy infrastructure
Estuaire Province